Natalie Hodgskin (born 24 May 1976 in Brisbane) is a softball player from Australia, who won a silver medal at the 2004 Summer Olympics.

External links
 Olympic profile

1976 births
Australian softball players
Living people
Olympic softball players of Australia
Softball players at the 2004 Summer Olympics
Olympic silver medalists for Australia
Sportswomen from Queensland
Olympic medalists in softball
Sportspeople from Brisbane
Medalists at the 2004 Summer Olympics